Rūjiena Municipality is a former municipality in Vidzeme, Latvia. The municipality was formed in 2009 by merging Rūjiena town, Ipiķi parish, Jeri parish, Lode parish and Vilpulka parish, the administrative centre being Rūjiena. The population in 2020 was 4,824.

On 1 July 2021, Rūjiena Municipalitu ceased to exist and its territory was merged into Valmiera Municipality.

See also 
 Administrative divisions of Latvia (2009)

References

External links

 
Former municipalities of Latvia